WHBC (1480 kHz) is an AM radio station in Canton, Ohio featuring a mixed news/talk and sports talk format supplemented with sports play-by-play.

The station is one of about 40 stations in the country that have split site transmitters—one site for daytime broadcasting and a different site for nighttime broadcasting. WHBC's daytime transmitter is located northeast of Canton off Diamond Street near Middlebranch Road. WHBC's night-time transmitter is located southwest of Canton off Gooding Street near the intersection of Sherman Church Avenue and Fohl Street. Its studios and offices are located in the historic WHBC building at 550 Market Avenue South in downtown Canton, where they have been for over 60 years.

History

Beginnings
WHBC is the oldest radio station in Canton. The license for the station was granted on February 13, 1925 to Father Edward P. Graham and the St. John Catholic Church

WHBC began broadcasting on March 9, 1925 at 1180 kHz with 100 watts. By the middle of 1927 the station had moved to 1270 kHz. Broadcasting had moved to 1200 kHz by the middle of 1930.

In 1936 the station was sold to secular interests, when it was purchased by Brush-Moore Newspapers, then owners of Canton's newspaper, The Repository. The station was sold in 1939 to a business group consisting of the Vodrey family of East Liverpool and the Boyd family of Portsmouth. The families organized ownership of the station under the name of the Ohio Broadcasting Company. They obtained approval to increase power to 250 watts daytime, while maintaining 100 watts at night. The station had no network affiliation until 1940 or 1941 when it became a Mutual affiliate. It became an ABC affiliate later in the 1940s.

On March 29, 1941, when most stations in the U.S. changed frequencies due to the North American Regional Broadcasting Agreement, WHBC moved from 1200 to 1230 kHz. It moved to its present frequency of 1480 kHz on June 4, 1944, when WGAR AM in Cleveland moved from 1480 to 1220. The station obtained an FM license in 1948 and established WHBC-FM on 94.1 MHz which still operates using those call letters.

In September 1947, WHBC's power increased from 1 kW to 5 kW. At that time, it was affiliated with both the ABC and Mutual networks.

On November 22, 1963, WHBC's afternoon talk show "Bee Line" was interrupted at 1:41pm for a bulletin from ABC news concerning the assassination of John F. Kennedy. The program was preserved on audio tape and can be found on the internet.

On September 26, 1967, the ownership was reorganized as WHBC, Inc., which changed its name to Beaverkettle Company on September 13, 1972. The Vodreys purchased WFIR in Roanoke, Virginia in 1969; they sold the station eight years later. In June 2000, the family-owned Beaverkettle Company sold WHBC and WHBC-FM to NextMedia for more than 42 million dollars.
ending 61 years of Vodrey family ownership of the stations.

Market dominance
For many years, WHBC was the only full-time AM station in Canton, as the stations on 900, 1060, and 1520 kHz were all daytimers, as also were 990 in Massillon and 1310 in Alliance (all but 1060 and 1520 were later granted modest night power under changes in the FCC rules).  As such, WHBC enjoyed enviable dominance in the Canton radio market, although stations from Akron and Cleveland could also be heard.

On March 26, 2007, WHBC ended its long-running Full Service format in favor of a full-time news/talk format, eliminating its remaining oldies-formatted dayparts. The station also broadcasts a show resurrected “Tradio”, a program where listeners can call in and sell items for sale.

Current
The station is an affiliate for the Cleveland Cavaliers, the Cleveland Browns and the Cleveland Indians as well as the Ohio State Sports Network.

WHBC was one of the first, if not the first, radio station to stream live play-by-play coverage of the Massillon Tigers and Canton McKinley high school football game over the Internet during the 1997 football season.  People from all parts of the United States and parts of Europe were able to listen to the game live via the Internet.

NextMedia sold WHBC and their 32 other radio stations to Digity, LLC for $85 million; the transaction was consummated on February 10, 2014.

In November 2014, 20-year veteran sports host Sam Bourquin ended his relationship with the station, after an announcement on WHBC.com and on WHBC's Facebook.com page, after the station attempted to move Bourquin to a slot in WHBC's morning show, where former Sports Director Jim Johnson had spent the bulk of his career before he retired.

Effective February 25, 2016, Digity and its 124 radio stations were acquired by Alpha Media for $264 million.

WHBC today

As of 2015, the majority of WHBC's schedule has shifted to sports oriented programming, though on weekdays there is still general news/talk programming, including a local morning drive show hosted by longtime WHBC personality Pam Cook. Gary Rivers shifted to a midday talk show when Ron Ponder, who had been the midday host since the shift to full-time news talk, was jettisoned in the first quarter of 2017.

Longtime NE Ohio sportscaster Kenny Roda hosts the afternoon drive sports talk show.  National shows heard on WHBC include those hosted by Markley, Van Camp and Robbins (via Compass Media Networks) and Jim Bohannon (Westwood One), as well as CBS Sports Radio airing weekday evenings and most of the day on weekends.

References

External links
History of St. John Church

Aerial photo of WHBC's daytime transmitter from Google Local
Aerial photo of WHBC's nighttime transmitter from Google Local

HBC
Alpha Media radio stations